Esther Afoyochan is a Ugandan politician who serves as the woman member of parliament. for Zombo district  She was elected in office as a woman representative in parliament during the 2021 Uganda general elections.

She is a member of the ruling National Resistance Movement party.

See also 
 List of members of the eleventh Parliament of Uganda.
National Resistance Movement.
 Zombo District.
Member of Parliament.
Parliament of Uganda.

References

External links 

 Website of the Parliament of Uganda

Living people
21st-century Ugandan women politicians
21st-century Ugandan politicians
National Resistance Movement politicians
Women members of the Parliament of Uganda
Members of the Parliament of Uganda
Zombo District
Year of birth missing (living people)